The Shadow Secretary of State for Scotland is a member of the UK Shadow Cabinet responsible for the scrutiny of the Secretary of State for Scotland and his/her department, the Scotland Office. The incumbent holder of the office is Ian Murray.

Shadow Secretaries of State

See also 

Secretary of State for Scotland
Scottish Office
UK Shadow Cabinet

References

External links 

Official Opposition (United Kingdom)
Government of Scotland